Archangel is a television adaptation of the 1998 novel of the same name by Robert Harris. Made by the BBC in 2005, it was filmed in the city of Riga.

Plot

Part 1

Dr. Christopher 'Fluke' Kelso, a British professor of Soviet history, attends a conference in Moscow where his lecture is interrupted by protestors from 'Aurora', a faction of Communist hardliners. He is approached by elderly Papu Rapava, who explains that as a young soldier in 1953, he escorted Lavrentiy Beria to Joseph Stalin's deathbed at his Kuntsevo Dacha. Rapava witnessed Beria steal a key from the dying Stalin, using it to retrieve a notebook from Stalin's private safe. Burying the notebook inside a toolbox in Beria's yard, Rapava was sworn to secrecy.

Kelso is determined to find the notebook, and a librarian directs him to Beria's old address. He questions powerful politician Vladimir Mamantov, Aurora's leader and a former KGB agent; this brings Kelso to the attention of FSB Major Suvorin, who has him followed. Sneaking into Beria's derelict mansion, Kelso discovers that the toolbox has already been dug up. Aware he is being tailed, Kelso slips away from Suvorin's plainclothes officer at the Hotel Ukraina, and finds Rapava's estranged daughter Zinaida at the club where she works. She reluctantly drives him to her father's apartment, where he finds Rapava murdered in the bathtub.

While calling the police, Kelso is mugged and then detained at the police station, but Suvorin has him released. Already investigating Mamantov for corruption, Suvorin suggests that Kelso's interest in the notebook led Mamantov to have Rapava killed. As Kelso prepares to be deported, American TV reporter A.J. O'Brian takes an interest in his search for the notebook. Zinaida finds Kelso, having received a note from her father. Informing Zinaida of her father's death, Kelso takes her to identify the body and explains that Mamantov may be responsible.

Part 2

Zinaida brings Kelso to her father's garage, where he finds a Makarov pistol and the missing toolbox. They are interrupted by O'Brian, who is eager to cover their discovery. Inside the toolbox, the notebook is revealed to be the journal of Anna, a young woman from Archangel selected to work for high-ranking officials in Moscow under Stalin. At O'Brian's office, Zinaida translates the journal: Anna cared for Stalin, observing his cruelty when he forced officials to dance for him, and he brought her to his room to dance herself when she was ovulating. Though the journal's last pages have been torn out, an NKVD report on Anna's medical history leads Kelso to conclude that she may have mothered an heir of Stalin.

Stealing O'Brian's car, Zinaida and Kelso return to her apartment, where she subdues one of Mamantov's henchmen and recovers her stash of money before they drive to Archangel. Aware of where they are headed, Mamantov is confronted by Suvorin about Rapava's murder. O'Brian airs a report linking the murder to the notebook, and his colleague Louise charters him a plane to Archangel. Bribing their way past a roadblock, Zinaida and Kelso reach Archangel and visit the local Communist Party records office. They learn that Anna's mother still lives in town, and flee from a pair of policemen, who are shot dead by Mamantov's henchman. O'Brian arrives, demanding to join their search.

The three learn from Anna's mother that Anna returned home pregnant, and died two days after giving birth to a son, who was adopted by a couple living in the forest. Suvorin questions Louise, learning about the search for Anna, and his superior orders him to recover the notebook. Kelso becomes suspicious of O'Brian's mysterious sources, and Zinaida realizes that both Anna and Anna's father were killed to protect the secret of her son's birth.

Part 3

Kelso and O'Brian investigate the forest, but their car is caught in an anti-tank trench. They encounter Josef, who announces himself as the man they are looking for: the son of Anna and Stalin. Zinaida hides her money and her father's pistol as she is arrested for the policemen's murder, but Suvorin comes to her aid. At his remote cabin, Josef presents Kelso and O'Brian with a suitcase of Stalin's belongings, and the passports and bloody written "confessions" from previous visitors he believed to be spies. Kelso and O'Brian fear they will meet the same fate, as a menacing Josef forces them to dance for him.

Awaking to find Josef gone, Kelso takes O'Brian to retrieve his satellite phone, and tries to stop him from broadcasting his footage of Josef. Suvorin reluctantly accompanies a Spetsnaz squad led by Major Kretov to the cabin, realizing too late that their orders are to kill everyone there. As they prepare to execute Kelso and O'Brian, Suvorin holds Kretov at gunpoint, and the soldiers come under fire from Josef. Kretov shoots Suvorin in the back, and O'Brian is wounded by a bear trap and killed by Kretov, who is shot by Josef. Allowing Kelso to escape, Josef shaves and dresses in Stalin's clothes, bearing a striking resemblance to his father, as a helicopter arrives for him.

Retrieving Zinaida's money and pistol from Anna's mother, Kelso pays for Zinaida's release. Fleeing by train, they learn that O'Brian's broadcast has revealed Josef's existence to the world. Kelso realizes that he was manipulated into confirming Josef as Stalin's heir, and is confronted by Mamantov. Having orchestrated Kelso's "discovery" of the notebook—from arranging the Moscow conference to buying Beria's house to tipping off O'Brian—Mamantov admits that Rapava's theft of the notebook and the military's interference were an unexpected "glitch" in his plan. They are joined by Josef, Mamantov's ultimate tool to seize power and usher in a new era of Stalinism.

Arriving at Vologda, Mamantov introduces Josef to a cheering crowd, while Kelso finds Louise and her cameraman, convincing them to film him as he explains the truth about Mamantov's scheme. He is interrupted and beaten by Mamantov's men, until Zinaida draws the Makarov and shoots Josef dead, avenging her father.

Cast
DVD credits order
 Daniel Craig as Professor Christopher Kelso
 Yekaterina Rednikova as Zinaida Rapava
 Gabriel Macht as R.J. O'Brien
 Konstantin Lavronenko as Josef
 Lev Prygunov as Vladimir Mamantov
 Alexey Diakov as Suvorin
 Ludmila Golubeva as Vavara
 Igor Filipov as Major Kretov
 Claudia Harrison as Louise
 Valery Chernyak as Old Papu
 Igor Chernawsky as Yakov
 Leonīds Lencs as Militia Captain
 Āris Rozentāls as Gregor
 Jelena Soldatova as Masha
 Kristina Brize as Young Zinaida
 Anatoly Putnya as Zinaida's brother
 Jonas Tamulevičius as Commando #1
 Stanislav Samuchov as Commando #2
 Leonidas Kotikas as Commando #3
 Andrei Riabokon as Commando #4

Reviews 
Brian Gallagher wrote on MovieWeb: "the thriller has something for everyone: The game of Craig, a mysterious story, lively dialogues, some action and romance."

References

External links
 

Films based on British novels
Films based on thriller novels
British thriller films
Television shows based on British novels
Films set in Moscow
Films about Joseph Stalin
Films directed by Jon Jones (director)
Films about the Federal Security Service
Films with screenplays by Dick Clement
Films with screenplays by Ian La Frenais
2005 films
2005 television films
2005 thriller films
2000s British films